The 2014–15 Marshall Thundering Herd men's basketball team represented Marshall University during the 2014–15 NCAA Division I men's basketball season. The Thundering Herd, led by first year head coach Dan D'Antoni, played their home games at the Cam Henderson Center and were members of Conference USA. They finished the season 11–21, 7–11 in C-USA play to finish in a tie for eleventh place. They lost in the first round of the C-USA tournament to WKU.

Previous season
The Thundering Herd finished the season 11–22, 4–12 in C-USA play to finish in a tie for fourteenth place. They advanced to the second round of the C-USA tournament where they lost to Old Dominion. At the end of the season, head coach Tom Herrion's remaining contract was bought out.

Preseason

Departures

Incoming transfers

Recruiting

Roster

Schedule 

|-
!colspan=9 style="background:#009B48; color:#FFFFFF;"| Exhibition

|-
!colspan=9 style="background:#009B48; color:#FFFFFF;"| Regular season

|-
!colspan=9 style="background:#009B48; color:#FFFFFF;"| Conference USA tournament

References

Marshall Thundering Herd men's basketball seasons
Marshall
2014 in sports in West Virginia
Marsh